Alexius II may refer to:

 Alexios II Komnenos (1167–1183), Byzantine Emperor
 Alexios II of Trebizond (1297–1330), Emperor of Trebizond
 Patriarch Alexy II of Moscow (1990–2008), Patriarch of Moscow and All Russia